Lehmberg is a surname. Notable people with the surname include:

 Rosemary Lehmberg (born  1949), American attorney
 Stanford Lehmberg (1931–2012), American historian and professor
  (1905–1959), Spanish composer